Glenrothes with Thornton railway station serves the communities of Glenrothes and Thornton in Fife, Scotland.

History

The station is situated on the Dunfermline Branch of the Edinburgh and Northern Railway, just west of its divergence from the E&NR main line via a triangular junction. It is a completely new structure, having been built by British Rail with the support of Fife Regional Council to serve the two communities that it is named after.

The successful inauguration of the Fife Circle Line service in 1989 had seen the Cardenden to Thornton Jn section reopened to passengers and this provided the catalyst for the construction of the station.  It was completed in the spring of 1992 and it was opened to traffic on 11 May that year, at the summer timetable change.

Though it has the appearance of a standard two platform station on a double track line, it is actually sited east of Thornton West Junction, where the double line from Cardenden splits into two parallel single lines that diverge after passing through the station to join the main line.

Services 

On Mondays to Saturdays, there are three trains per hour to Edinburgh. The majority of services in either direction depart from Platform 1 as noted. 2 of these services run via Kirkcaldy(One of which starts and terminates here) whilst the other runs via Dunfermline, In the evenings, Trains to Edinburgh only run via Dunfermline and on Sundays, An hourly service runs to Edinburgh both via Kirkcaldy and Dunfermline, These trains use Platform 1.
 
There is a limited service to/from Perth, As of 2018, This is as follows
Monday to Fridays. There is 2 trains per day to Perth and there is also 2 trains from Perth which operate to Edinburgh via Dunfermline, 1 train per day from Edinburgh terminates here using Platform 2 but the train then goes out of service upon arriving at the station and then goes ECS (Empty Coaching Stock to Perth). On Saturdays, There is 2 trains per day to Perth and 1 from Perth, On Sundays, There is 1 train to and 2 trains from Perth, These services use Platform 2.

Typical off peak service:

2tph to Edinburgh Waverley via Kirkcaldy

1tph to Edinburgh Waverley via Dunfermline City

From May 2022 it is proposed to have the following service

2tph to Edinburgh Waverley via Dunfermline City

1tph to Perth

1tph from Edinburgh Waverley terminating here (this will extend to Leven upon completion of the Levenmouth rail link.)

References

External links 

Railway stations in Fife
Railway stations opened by British Rail
Railway stations in Great Britain opened in 1992
Railway stations served by ScotRail
1992 establishments in Scotland